The 1920 International Cross Country Championships was held in Belfast, Ireland, at the Belvoir Park on 3 April 1920.   A report on the event was given in the Glasgow Herald.

Complete results, medallists, 
 and the results of British athletes were published.

Medallists

Individual Race Results

Men's (10 mi / 16.1 km)

Team Results

Men's

Participation
An unofficial count yields the participation of 35 athletes from 4 countries.

 (9)
 (9)
 (9)
 (8)

See also
 1920 in athletics (track and field)

References

International Cross Country Championships
International Cross Country Championships
Cross
International Cross Country Championships
Cross country running in Ireland
Cross country running in the United Kingdom
1920s in Ireland
20th century in Belfast
Sports competitions in Belfast
International Cross Country Championships